The Committee on the Present Danger (CPD) is the name used by a succession of American neoconservative and anti-communist foreign policy interest groups. Throughout its four iterations—in the 1950s, the 1970s, the 2000s, and 2019, it has tried to influence all the presidential administrations since Harry S. Truman, achieving notable success during the Reagan administration.

Overview
The committee first met in 1950, founded by Tracy Voorhees, to promote the plans proposed in NSC 68 by Paul Nitze and Dean Acheson. It lobbied the government directly and sought to influence public opinion through a publicity campaign, notably a weekly radio broadcast on the Mutual Broadcasting System throughout 1951. This iteration was effectively disbanded after 1952, following the appointment of Voorhees and others to senior positions in the administration.

It was privately revived in March 1976 to try to influence the presidential candidates and their advisors. After Jimmy Carter won the election, CPD went public again and spent the next four years lobbying, particularly against détente and the SALT II agreement. Its hawkish conclusions influenced the CIA's future reporting on the Soviet threat.  This iteration of the CPD provided 33 officials to the Ronald Reagan administration, plus Reagan himself.

History

First CPD (1950s) 
On 12 December 1950, James Conant, Tracy Voorhees and Vannevar Bush announced the creation of the committee on the Present Danger. The group was formed in order to support the Truman Administration's remilitarization plans contained within NSC 68. The 'present danger' to which the group's title referred was "the aggressive designs of the Soviet Union", the CPD announced.

Members of the First CPD 
 James B. Conant (Chairman)
 Tracy S. Voorhees (Vice Chairman)

 Julius Ochs Adler
 Raymond B. Allen
 Frank Altschul
 Dillon Anderson
 William Douglas Arant
 James Phinney Baxter, III
 Laird Bell
 Barry Bingham
 Harry A. Bullis
 Vannevar Bush
 William L. Clayton
 Robert Cutler
 R. Ammi Cutter
 Mrs. Dwight Davis
 E.L. DeGolyer
 Harold Willis Dodds
 Charles Dollard
 William J. Donovan
 Goldthwaite H. Dorr
 David Dubinsky
 Leonard K. Firestone
 Truman K. Gibson Jr.
 Miss Meta Glass
 Arthur J. Goldberg
 Samuel Goldwyn
 W. W. Grant
 Edward S. Greenbaum
 Paul G. Hoffman
 Monte H. Lemann
 William L. Marbury
 Stanley Marcus
 Dr. William C. Menninger
 Frederick A. Middlebush
 James L. Morrill
 Edward R. Murrow
 John Lord O'Brian
 Floyd B. Odlum
 J. Robert Oppenheimer
 Robert P. Patterson
 Howard C. Petersen
 Daniel A. Poling
 Stanley Resor
 Samuel Rosenman
 Theodore W. Schultz
 Robert E. Sherwood
 Edgar W. Smith
 Robert G. Sproul
 Robert L. Stearns
 Edmund A. Walsh, S.J.
 W. W. Waymack
 Henry M. Wriston
 J. D. Zellerbach

Second CPD (1970s) 
On 11 November 1976, the second iteration was announced. The name of this version of the committee was "borrow[ed]" from the 1950s version, and was not a direct successor.

Some of its members lobbied for, and were members of, the 1976 Team B, providing an opposing view to the CIA's Team A.

Thirty-three officials of the Reagan administration were CPD members, including Director of Central Intelligence William Casey, National Security Advisor Richard V. Allen, United States Ambassador to the United Nations Jeane Kirkpatrick, Secretary of the Navy John Lehman, Secretary of State George Shultz, and Assistant Secretary of Defense Richard Perle. Reagan himself was a member in 1979.

Founding members of the second CPD 

 Achilles, Theodore C.
 Allen, Richard V.
 Allison, John M.
 Anderson, Eugenie
 Beam, Jacob D.
 Bellow, Saul
 Bendetsen, Karl R.
 Burgess, W. Randolph
 Cabot, John M.
 Casey, William J,
 Chaikin, Sol C.
 Cline, Ray S.
 Colby, William E.
 Connally, John B.
 Connor, John T.
 Darden, Colgate W. Jr.
 Dean, Arthur H.
 Dillon, C. Douglas
 Dogole, S. Harrison
 Dominick, Peter H.
 Dowling, Walter
 DuBrow, Evelyn
 Farrell, James T.
 Fellman, David
 Fowler, Henry H.
 Frelinghuysen, Peter H. B.
 Glazer, Nathan
 Goodpaster, Andrew J.
 Grace, J. Peter
 Gray, Gordon
 Handlin, Oscar
 Hauser, Rita E.
 Hurewitz, J. C.
 Johnson, Chalmers
 Jordan, David C.
 Kampelman, Max M.
 Kemp, Geoffrey
 Keyserling, Leon H.
 Kirkland, Lane
 Kirkpatrick, Jeanne J.
 Kohler Foy D.
 Krogh, Peter
 Lefever, Ernest W.
 Lemnitzer, Lyman L.
 Libby, W. F.
 Lipset, Seymour Martin
 Lovestone, Jay
 Luce, Clare Boothe
 Martin, William McChesney Jr.
 McCabe, Edward A.
 McGhee, George C.
 McNair, Robert E.
 Morse, Joshua M.
 Muller, Steven
 Mulliken, Robert S.
 Myerson, Bess
 Nitze, Paul H.
 Olmsted, George
 Packard, David
 Podhoretz, Midge Dector
 Podhoretz, Norman
 Ramey, Estelle R.
 Ramsey, Paul
 Ridgway, Matthew B.
 Rostow, Eugene V.
 Rusk, Dean
 Rustin, Bayard
 Saltzman, Charles E.
 Scaife, Richard M.
 Schifter, Richard
 Seabury, Paul
 Shanker, Albert
 Tanham, George K.
 Taylor, Maxwell D.
 Teller, Edward
 Tyroler, Charles, II.
 Van Cleave, William R.
 Walker, Charls E.
 Wigner, Eugene P.
 Wilcox, Francis O.
 Wolfe, Bertram D.
 Zumwalt, Elmo R.

Third CPD (2004)
In June 2004, The Hill reported that a third incarnation of CPD was being planned, to address the War on Terrorism. This incarnation of the committee was still active as of 2008. The head of the 2004 CPD, PR pro and former Reagan adviser Peter D. Hannaford, explained, "we saw a parallel" between the Soviet threat and the threat from terrorism. The message that CPD will convey through lobbying, media work and conferences is that the war on terror needs to be won, he said.

Members of the 2004 CPD included Vice President for Policy Larry Haas, Senator Joseph I. Lieberman, former CIA director R. James Woolsey Jr., former National Security Advisor to President Reagan, Robert C. McFarlane, and Reagan administration official and 1976 Committee founder Max Kampelman. At the July 20, 2004 launching of the 2004 CPD, Lieberman and Senator Jon Kyl were identified as the honorary co-chairs.

Fourth CPD (2019)
The fourth CPD was established on March 25, 2019, branding itself "Committee on the Present Danger: China" (CPDC). Members include both China-focused specialists and others without specific experience related to the country, and are predominantly conservative.

Members of the Fourth CPD
 Brian Kennedy, Chairman
 Frank Gaffney, Vice Chairman

 Steve Bannon
 William Bennett
 William G. Boykin
 Gordon G. Chang
 Nicholas Eftimiades
 Kevin Freeman
 Bob Fu
 Mark Helprin
 Steven L. Kwast
 Tidal McCoy
 Bob McEwen
 Thomas McInerney
 Steven W. Mosher
 Scott Perry
 Benedict Peters
 Miles Prentice
 Suzanne Scholte
 Arthur Waldron
 Frank Wolf
 R. James Woolsey Jr.
 Yang Jianli

Criticisms
The fourth iteration of CPD, focused on China, has been criticized as promoting a revival of Red Scare politics in the United States, and for its ties to conspiracy theorist Frank Gaffney and conservative activist Steve Bannon. David Skidmore, writing for The Diplomat, saw it as another instance of "adolescent hysteria" in US diplomacy, as another of the "fevered crusades [which] have produced some of the costliest mistakes in American foreign policy".

See also
 Citizens for a Free Kuwait
 Coalition for a Democratic Majority
 Committee for Peace and Security in the Gulf
 Committee for the Liberation of Iraq
 Foreign policy interest group
 Institute on Religion and Democracy
 Neoconservative

References

Further reading

 Boies, John, and Nelson A. Pichardo (1993–1994). "The Committee on the Present Danger: A Case for the Importance of Elite Social Movement Organizations to Theories of Social Movements and the State". Berkeley Journal of Sociology 38: 57-87. .
 Singh, Robert. "Neoconservatism in the Age of Obama", in  Inderjeet Parmar, ed., Obama and the World (Routledge, 2014). pp. 51–62.

External links
 Committee on the Present Danger: China
 CPD Home page (Third CPD)
 The Committee on the Present Danger Papers at the Hoover Institution

Political and economic think tanks in the United States
Foreign policy and strategy think tanks in the United States
United States political action committees
Anti-communist organizations in the United States